Norman Cedric Harris (11 September 1906 – 4 October 1985) was an Australian rules footballer who played with Fitzroy in the Victorian Football League (VFL).

Notes

External links 

1906 births
1985 deaths
Australian rules footballers from Victoria (Australia)
Fitzroy Football Club players
People from Collingwood, Victoria